Charles Harold Wilfred de Soysa MA (1907-1971) was the first Ceylonese Anglican Bishop of Colombo, Sri Lanka.

Born to Sir Wilfred and Lady Evelyn de Soysa, he was educated at Royal College, Colombo and graduated from Oriel College, Oxford obtaining Second Class Honours in Theology. Thereafter he was trained for the Priesthood at Cuddesdon College and was ordained in 1934 at St Paul's Cathedral.

After working in England for a short period, he returned to Ceylon to serve in Kandy and Moratuwa. He was the Principal of the Colombo Divinity School and was made the Archdeacon of Colombo in 1955. In 1964 he became the first Ceylonese Bishop of Colombo and was one of only two Bishops of Colombo to be elected uncontested.

He played a very important role in the Ecumenical Movement and the Church Union. In fact, his work in this area was so well recognised that he was one of three delegates appointed by the Archbishop of Canterbury, Dr. Michael Ramsey in the Anglican-Roman Catholic conversations.

He was instrumental in the construction of the Cathedral of Christ the Living Saviour. He died before its completion in 1971 and was interred at the Cathedral. His younger brother, Ryle de Soysa, was a first-class cricketer.

See also
Church of Ceylon
Anglican Bishop of Colombo
Anglican Diocese of Colombo
Theological College of Lanka

References

External links
 The Church of Ceylon (Anglican Communion)
 Anglican Church of Ceylon News
 
 The Church of Ceylon: Her Faith and Mission (A Centenary Book) Edited by C. H. W. de Soysa.

Sri Lankan Anglican bishops
Anglican bishops of Colombo
Archdeacons of Colombo
Catholic–Anglican ecumenism
Alumni of Royal College, Colombo
Alumni of Oriel College, Oxford
Alumni of Ripon College Cuddesdon
Sri Lankan expatriates in the United Kingdom
Harold
1907 births
1971 deaths
20th-century Anglican bishops in Asia